The August 1 Medal, sometimes known as the Order of Bayi, was a Chinese military award awarded to heroes of the Liberation of China during the First Chinese Civil War(that started on August 1st,1927). There are three grades: First Class, Second Class, and Third Class.

Pattern

Service Ribbon

Notable recipients 
 Ten Marshals: Zhu De, Peng Dehuai, Lin Biao, Liu Bocheng, He Long, Chen Yi, Luo Ronghuan, Xu Xiangqian, Nie Rongzhen, Ye Jianying.
 Ten Senior Generals: Su Yu, Xu Haidong, Huang Kecheng, Chen Geng, Tan Zheng, Xiao Jinguang, Zhang Yunyi, Luo Ruiqing, Wang Shusheng, Xu Guangda.
 General officer: Song Renqiong, Wang Zhen, Xu Shiyou, etc.
 Lieutenant general: Kong Qingde, Wang Jinshan, Wang Shangrong, etc.
 Major general: Han Dongshan, Jin Rubai, Sun Chaoqun, Yang Yongsong, etc.
 Senior colonel: Zhou Shiyuan, Luo Houfu, and Xing Shixiu.
 Soldiers: Feng Baiju, Feng Zhongyun, Li Yanlu, and Zhou Baozhong.

References 

Military awards and decorations of the People's Liberation Army
Awards established in 1955
1955 establishments in China